South Shore International College Preparatory High School (commonly known as South Shore) is a public four–year selective enrollment high school located in the South Shore neighborhood on the southeast side of Chicago, Illinois, United States. Opened in 1940 as South Shore High School, South Shore is a part of the Chicago Public Schools district.

History
South Shore opened in 1940 as South Shore High School at 7626 South Constance Avenue. During the early days, the school was predominantly white; mostly populated by pupils in the South Shore community. By the late–1950s, the community began experiencing an increase in the population of African-Americans. South Shore, which was built to accommodate a total of 2,000 students, became overcrowded by 1964. Chicago Public Schools and the Chicago Board of Education decided a new school needed to be built to relieve the overcrowding. The plan to build a further extension of the school was implemented in 1965.  Construction on the extension building at 75th street and Constance avenue began in April 1966. The extension school was to cost $2.5 million to build and was to be completed by 1967, but it was revised several times, gaining a budget of $4.1 million. The extension was constructed by Oak Park, Illinois' Mercury Builders between 1966 and completed in August 1969. The new extension opened for students on September 6, 1969.

Demographics
As of the 2021–2022 school year, 95.5% of South Shore's student body is African-American, 0.2% Asian, 3.3% Hispanic, and 1.0% other. Low-income students make up 76.5% of South Shore's student body.

Small schools (2001–2011) 
Beginning in 2001, the school campus, located at 7527–7627 South Constance Avenue was divided into four small specialized high schools: the School of Entrepreneurship, the School of the Arts, the School of Leadership, and the School of Technology. The small school concept continued until the Chicago Board of Education decided to phase out the school in 2009; this was completed at the end of the 2010–11 school year.

School of Leadership
After the phasing out of two of the small schools, the extension building was demolished in early 2012. The remaining students of the schools were moved into South Shore School of Leadership; being housed only in its original campus on Constance Avenue for the 2011–2012 school year. At the time, the Chicago Public Schools opened a new South Shore school: a selective enrollment school to attract students from all areas of the city. The leadership school was eventually phased out and closed at the end of the 2013–2014 school year, being fully replaced by the new school.

Other information
The school's newspaper The Shore Line won a first-place ranking in the American Scholastic Press Association annual review in 1983. The newspaper was the first to win a first-place ranking in the city. The school students won first place two consecutive times in an annual essay contest sponsored by the citizen school's committee in 1981 and 1982. The school was a part of a CBS documentary about the city's public school system in 1984.

South Shore International College Prep
South Shore International College Prep High School opened for the 2011–2012 school year adjacent to the former South Shore High School location and park. South Shore International College Prep is a selective enrollment magnet school that accepts students from throughout the city of Chicago. The school uses the same team name (Tars) and colors (Kelly Green and Royal Blue) as the former South Shore High School

Athletics
South Shore competes in the Chicago Public League (CPL) and is a member of the Illinois High School Association (IHSA). The boys' basketball team were Public League champions in 1943–1944 and 1946–1947. The school girls' track and field team placed first in the state in Class AA in 1980–1981. The school boys' track and field team placed first in 2A Sectionals Chicago (St. Rita) in the 2021–2022 School Year. The boys' football team were Great Lakes League champions in 2021–2022 school year.

Notable alumni
 Doe Boyland – professional baseball player
 Frank Donald Drake (1948) – Astronomer and astrophysicist. Co-founder of the SETI Institute
 Stanley Elkin – novelist and short story writer
 Larry Ellison (1962) – CEO and co-founder of Oracle Corporation
 Jake Fendley (1947) – professional basketball player
 Carla Hayden (1969) – 14th Librarian of Congress
 Trent Hubbard (1982) – professional baseball outfielder
 Marv Levy (1943) – NFL coach and member of the Pro Football Hall of Fame
 Marc May (1974) – NFL tight end (1987)
 Suze Orman (1969) – author, financial advisor, television producer, and television host
 Karalyn Patterson (1961) – psychologist
 Cynthia Plaster Caster (1965) – artist
 Reggie Smith (1990) – college basketball player
 Walter Stanley (1981) – former NFL wide receiver (1985–92)
 James D. Watson (1946) – biochemist and co-discoverer of the structure of DNA
Jerald Walker (1981) - writer and professor (https://emerson.edu/faculty-staff-directory/jerald-walker); Guggenheim fellow, National Book Award finalist (https://en.wikipedia.org/wiki/Jerald_Walker)

References

Public high schools in Chicago
Educational institutions established in 1940
Former high schools in Illinois
1940 establishments in Illinois